The Craig and Virginia Sheaffer House, also known as the John and Marion Keenan House, is a historic residence located in Fort Madison, Iowa, United States. It was listed on the National Register of Historic Places in 1993.

Craig Sheaffer served as the president of the Sheaffer Pen Company, which had been established by his father Walter, and as an Under Secretary of Commerce during part of World War II. The house is part of a complex of houses built by the Sheaffer family. The Walter A. Sheaffer House just to the west of this house is also listed on the National Register. The other two houses were built for Craig and Virginia's sons Walter and John. John and Marion Keenan bought this house from the Sheaffer family. He also served as president of the Sheaffer Pen Company.

The Craig and Virginia Sheaffer House is a large Tudor Revival completed in 1929. It was designed by the Chicago architectural firm of Mayo and Mayo. It is located on a landscaped property on a bluff overlooking the Mississippi River. The landscaping, completed in 1931, is a contributing site in the house's historic nomination. The exterior is mostly composed of textured brick laid in both patterned and Flemish bond coursing. Some of the gables are faced with limestone while other wall surfaces are composed of a mix of brick and stone. One of the gables and another section of the house feature half-timbering composed of cypress wood and stucco infill.

References

External links

Houses completed in 1929
Tudor Revival architecture in Iowa
Houses on the National Register of Historic Places in Iowa
National Register of Historic Places in Lee County, Iowa
Houses in Fort Madison, Iowa